Fabio Oggiano (born 8 July 1987) is an Italian footballer who plays as a forward for Nola in the Serie D.

Club career
On 3 July 2018, he joined Serie D club Taranto.

Oggiano joined to Serie D club Messina on 15 April 2021.

On 27 July 2022, Oggiano signed with Nola in Serie D.

References

External links

1987 births
Living people
Footballers from Sardinia
Italian footballers
Association football forwards
Serie C players
Serie D players
Eccellenza players
Pol. Alghero players
Forlì F.C. players
Olbia Calcio 1905 players
U.S. Viterbese 1908 players
Reggina 1914 players
F.C. Lumezzane V.G.Z. A.S.D. players
Cavese 1919 players
Taranto F.C. 1927 players
A.C.R. Messina players